Rudolph (Rollo) William Basil Feilding, 8th Earl of Denbigh, 7th Earl of Desmond (9 April 1823 – 10 March 1892) was a British peer, succeeding to his titles on the death in 1865 of his father, the 7th Earl of Denbigh. He was noted as a Roman Catholic convert, and founder of the Franciscan friary at Pantasaph, North Wales.

Life
He was educated at Eton College and Trinity College, Cambridge, where he was president of the University Pitt Club and took the degree of M.A. in 1844.

He was received into the Catholic Church in 1850, and took an active part in many Catholic works of charity under Cardinal Wiseman. As Viscount Feilding he was appointed honorary treasurer, jointly with Viscount Campden and Archibald J. Dunn, of the Peter's Pence Association. In 1850 he was appointed High Sheriff of Flintshire.

On 29 June 1860 he raised the 4th (Holywell) Flintshire Rifle Volunteer Corps as captain-commandant. After the unit was incorporated into the 1st Administrative Battalion, Flintshire Rifle Volunteer Corps, he commanded that from 1862 with the rank of major. On 2 July 1873 he became the battalion's honorary colonel, and continued in that role with its successor, the 2nd Volunteer Battalion, Royal Welch Fusiliers.

He married first Louisa Pennant, great-granddaughter of the Welsh naturalist and travel writer Thomas Pennant. She died of consumption in 1853, and he then married Mary Berkeley of Spetchley, Worcestershire, and had, among others, a son and successor Rudolph Feilding, 9th Earl of Denbigh (1859–1939); his second son Everard Feilding (1867–1936), Hon. Sec. of the Society for Psychical Research; and a daughter Lady Winefride Mary Elizabeth (24 September 1868 – 24 February 1959), who married Gervase Elwes on 11 May 1889.

After his death aged 68 in 1892, he was interred with his first wife Louisa at Pantasaph, dressed in the habit of the Third Order of St Francis, of which he was a member.

References

Further reading

External links

1823 births
1892 deaths
People educated at Eton College
English Roman Catholics
Converts to Roman Catholicism from Anglicanism
High Sheriffs of Flintshire
Rudolph
Earls of Denbigh
Desmond, Rudolph Feilding, 7th Earl of